BeijingDance/LDTX "(LDTX)" is a modern dance company co-founded by Willy Tsao and LI Hanzhong in 2005.  It is China’s first officially registered private professional modern dance company founded independently from government.

LDTX is an acronym for Lei Dong Tian Xian which translated as “thunder rumbles under the universe”. The company’s mission is to provide a platform where Chinese dance artists may freely express their multi-dimensional thoughts and sentiments of today’s China, embodying the modern dance attributes of individuality, mindful of zeitgeist and originality. Its dancers come from cities across China, infusing individuality with exquisite techniques and excellent creativity. The company performs not only in cities across China, it also presented in more than 20 countries across five continents.

BeijingDance / LDTX presents and organizes the annual Beijing Dance Festival, which has become an important international cultural exchange festivity.

References

External links
 Year of Australian Culture in China Featured Performance BeijingDance/LDTX “2010 International Platform” First Ritual

Modern dance companies
Dance companies in China
Arts organizations established in 2005